Henry Richardson may refer to:

Politics
Henry Westman Richardson (1855–1918), Canadian businessman and Senator
Henry Robson Richardson (1879–1966), politician in Manitoba, Canada
Henry Richardson (politician) (1883–?), politician in Northern Ireland
Henry J. Richardson Jr., lawyer, judge, and state legislator in Indiana

Sports
Henry Richardson (cricketer, born 1846) (1846–1921), English businessman and cricketer
Henry Richardson (cricketer, born 1857) (1857–1940), English cricketer
Henry B. Richardson (1889–1963), Olympic archer
Henry Richardson (baseball) (1917-1981), Negro league baseball player

Others
Henry Hobson Richardson (1838–1886), architect
Henry Handel Richardson (1870–1946), author
Henry S. Richardson, academic and educator
Henry Richardson (film editor) (born 1936), English and American film editor
Henry Richardson (artist) (born 1961), sculptor

See also
Harry Richardson (disambiguation)